Agustín Jesús Lastra (born 2 January 2001) is an Argentine footballer currently playing as a goalkeeper for Aldosivi on loan from Boca Juniors.

Career statistics

Club

Notes

References

2001 births
Living people
Sportspeople from Tucumán Province
Argentine footballers
Association football goalkeepers
Argentine Primera División players
Boca Juniors footballers
Aldosivi footballers